The Vesuvius Observatory is the surveillance centre for monitoring the three volcanic areas of Campania, Italy: Mount Vesuvius, the Phlegrean Fields and Ischia. Founded in 1841 on the slopes of Mount Vesuvius by Ferdinand II of Bourbon, King of the Two Sicilies, it is the oldest volcanology institute in the world. Its current operative center is based in Naples, hosting an important section of the National Institute of Geophysics and Volcanology.

External links

 Official Website

Volcano observatories
Mount Vesuvius
Buildings and structures in Campania
1841 establishments in Italy
1841 in science